α-Gurjunene synthase (EC 4.2.3.72) is an enzyme with systematic name (2E,6E)-farnesyl-diphosphate diphosphate-lyase ((–)-α-gurjunene-forming). This enzyme catalyses the following chemical reaction

 (2E,6E)-farnesyl diphosphate  (–)-α-gurjunene + diphosphate

Initial cyclization probably gives bicyclogermacrene in an enzyme-bound form.

References

External links 
 

EC 4.2.3